On September 21, 2007, the graduate programs in North Carolina State University's College of Management were brought under one name - the Jenkins Graduate School of Management.  The programs were named in honor of Benjamin (Ben) P. Jenkins, III, a 1968 graduate of the university and vice-chairman and president of the General Bank at Wachovia Corporation.

The Jenkins Graduate School includes the Master of Accounting and Master of Business Administration programs in the NC State College of Management, and the Graduate Economics Program offered jointly by NC State's colleges of agriculture and life sciences and management.

The naming gift will be used to endow professorships and provide graduate scholarships for students.  In addition, the naming of the graduate school will result in better name recognition for NC State's programs with students while competing with Duke University's Fuqua School of Business and the University of North Carolina at Chapel Hill's Kenan-Flagler Business School.

Programs Offered 

Master of Accounting
One-year program, Full-Time and Part-Time
Fall 2007 enrollment: 94

Curriculum includes IT concentration

Master of Business Administration
Full-Time & Part-Time MBA, main campus & Research Triangle Park locations
Fall 2007 enrollment: 328

Concentrations:
BioPharma Management, 
Innovation Management, 
Entrepreneurship,
Marketing Management,
Financial Management, 
Services Management, 
Information Technology Management, 
Supply Chain Management

Master of Global Innovation Management

Full-Time, dual degree in international management for technical and science oriented graduates

Economics Graduate programs
Degree options offered jointly with NC State's College of Agricultural and Life Sciences
Fall 2007 enrollment: 85 Ph.D., 65 Master's degree Options:
Ph.D. in Economics
Master of Economics
M.A. in Economics
M.S. in Agricultural and Resource Economics
Accelerated Bachelor's-Master's Degree Program

Rankings

Public Accounting Report MAC: 20
Bloomberg Business MBA: 29 
U.S. News & World Report Graduate Economics: 48

About the College 

2007 Jenkins Graduate School of Management Named within the College of Management
2007 Innovation Management School launched by Executive Programs and the Center for
Innovation Management Studies, in partnership with the Industrial Research Institute
2006 College opens Research Triangle Park site for part-time MBA Program
2005 Business Ethics Competition launched
2003 $10K Open Division added to EEI Business Plan Competition
2002 MBA Program established
1999 MS/Computer Networking with NC State's College of Engineering
1994 EEI Business Plan Competition launched by Entrepreneurship Education Initiative
1994 MAC Program established
1992 College established

Faculty: 110

Curriculum: Focused on the management of innovation and technology, emphasizing real-world experience

About the University 

North Carolina State University's College of Management is located in Raleigh, North Carolina, part of North Carolina's Research Triangle Park.  With over 31,000 students and nearly 8,000 faculty, NC State is a comprehensive university known for its leadership in education and research, and globally recognized for its science, technology, engineering and mathematics leadership. NC State is ranked third in the country [among universities without medical schools] for industry-sponsored research. The College of Management's undergraduate and graduate business programs are accredited by AACSB International.

References

External links 
 http://www.mgt.ncsu.edu/profiles/college/2007/jenkins/
 http://www.mba.ncsu.edu/
 http://www.mac.ncsu.edu/
 http://mgt.ncsu.edu/econ_grad/
 http://mgt.ncsu.edu/pdfs/factpage_sept_07.pdf
https://web.archive.org/web/20130807063240/http://poole.ncsu.edu/index-exp.php/jenkins

Business schools in North Carolina
North Carolina State University
Educational institutions established in 2007
2007 establishments in North Carolina